Liotipoma splendida is a species of small sea snail with calcareous opercula, a marine gastropod mollusk in the family Colloniidae.

Description
The shell grows to a height of 5.1 mm

Distribution
This marine species occurs off New Caledonia.

References

External links
 To World Register of Marine Species
 

Colloniidae
Gastropods described in 2012